is a football club based in Nishitōkyō, Tokyo, which is located in Tokyo in Japan. They played in the Kantō Soccer League, until 2019, when they were relegated to the Tokyo prefectural league, which is part of Japanese Regional Leagues.

History
Their main goal is becoming a professional football club, even though they only formed in 2007 and still play in the 2nd division of the Kanto Soccer League.

Current squad
Updated to 15 November 2017.

League record

References

External links
Official Site 
Official Facebook Page
Official Twitter Account
YouTube channel

Football clubs in Japan
Football clubs in Tokyo
Nishitōkyō, Tokyo
Association football clubs established in 2007
2007 establishments in Japan